The 2009 FIBA Europe Under-16 Championship Division B was an international basketball competition held in Portugal in 2009.

Medalists
1.   Bulgaria

2.   Denmark 

3.   England

Final ranking (comparative)
1.  Slovenia

2.  Bulgaria

3.  Sweden

4.  England

5.  Denmark 

6.  Portugal

7.  Romania

8.  Finland

9.  Hungary

10.  Belgium

11.  Switzerland

12.  Belarus

13.  Austria

14.  Luxembourg

15.  Slovakia

16.  Georgia

17.  Ireland

18.  Netherlands

External links
FIBA Archive

FIBA U16 European Championship Division B
Under-16 Championship Division B
FIBA Europe Under-16 Championship Division B
International youth basketball competitions hosted by Portugal